The Adventures of the Diogenes Damsel is a Big Finish Productions audio drama featuring Lisa Bowerman as Bernice Summerfield, a character from the spin-off media based on the long-running British science fiction television series Doctor Who.

Plot 
Bernice finds herself marooned in Victorian London where she seeks the help of Mycroft Holmes.

Cast
Bernice Summerfield - Lisa Bowerman
Mycroft Holmes - David Warner
Straxus - Peter Miles
Septimus - Simon Kingsley

Continuity
Bernice met Sherlock Holmes and Dr John Watson in the Doctor Who New Adventures novel, All-Consuming Fire. Mycroft also appeared in that book, although the two characters did not meet.
The character of Straxus is a recurring character in Big Finish's Eighth Doctor Adventures.
Septimus and his "brother" are identified as Cwejen, from the Faction Paradox range of Doctor Who spin-offs (which have also featured Sherlock Holmes).  This is the first time a Big Finish release has explicitly acknowledged Faction Paradox continuity.

External links
Big Finish Productions - Professor Bernice Summerfield: The Adventure of the Diogenes Damsel

2008 audio plays
Bernice Summerfield audio plays
Sherlock Holmes pastiches
Fiction set in the 27th century